The Midway T Unit is an arcade system board designed by Midway and successor to the Midway Y Unit.

Specifications
 Main CPU: TMS34010 @ 6.25 MHz
 Sound CPU: Motorola 6809 @ 2 MHz 
 Sound chip: Yamaha YM2151 @ 3.58 MHz, DAC, OKI MSM6295 @ 8 kHz
 Graphics: 400×254, 32768 colors, 53.20 Hz

Mortal Kombat II uses the DCS Sound System (ADSP2105 @ 10 MHz and a DMA-driven DAC).

List of T Unit games
 Judge Dredd (prototype, unreleased)
 Mortal Kombat (Version 4.0-5.0)
 Mortal Kombat II
 NBA Jam
 NBA Jam Tournament Edition

List of Z Unit games
 NARC

List of Y Unit games
 Terminator 2: Judgment Day (arcade game) (Version LA1)
 Mortal Kombat (Version 1.0-4.0)
 Total Carnage Trog Smash TV High Impact Football Strike Force (video game) Super High ImpactList of V Unit games
 Cruis'n World Cruis'n USA War Gods (video game) Off Road ChallengeList of Wolf Unit Games
 Mortal Kombat 3 Ultimate Mortal Kombat 3 WWF WrestleMania NHL: 2-on-2 Open Ice Challenge NBA Hangtime NBA Maximum Hangtime Rampage World TourList of X Unit games
 Terminator 2: Judgment Day (arcade game) (Version LA2, LA3 & LA4)
 Revolution X'' (Revision 1.0 6/16/1994)

References
 Midway T Unit at system16.com

Arcade system boards
Midway Games